Events from the year 1850 in Germany.

Incumbents
 King of Bavaria – Maximilian II
 King of Hanover – Ernest Augustus
 King of Prussia – Frederick William IV
 King of Saxony – Frederick Augustus II

Events
 31 January – The Constitution of Prussia is adopted.
 25 July - Battle of Isted
 28 August – Richard Wagner's opera Lohengrin premieres in Weimar under the direction of Franz Liszt.
 24 November - Battle of Lottorf
 29 November – The Punctation of Olmütz was agreed between the Austrian Empire and Prussia. It granted the Austrians leadership of the revived German Confederation.

Births
 6 January - Eduard Bernstein, German politician (died 1932)
 17 February - Georg Theodor August Gaffky, German bacteriologist (died 1918)
 7 March - Georg von Vollmar, Bavarian politician (died 1922)
 9 March - Josias von Heeringen, German general (died 1926)
 18 March - Ernst Büchner, German chemist (died 1924)
 1 April - Hans von Pechmann, German chemist (died 1902)
 9 April - Hermann Zumpe, German conductor and composer (died 1903) 
 16 April – Paul von Breitenbach, German railway planner (died 1930)
 6 June – Karl Ferdinand Braun, winner of the 1909 Nobel Prize in Physics (died 1918)
 13 June - Max Lenz, German historian (died 1932)
 12 July - Otto Schoetensack, German anthropologist (died 1912)
 20 October - Adolf Rosenzweig, German rabbi (died 1918)
 16 December - Hans Ernst August Buchner, German bacteriologist (died 1902)

Deaths 
 27 January - Johann Gottfried Schadow, German sculptor (born 1764)
 13 May - Johann Jakob Bernhardi, German physician and botanist (born 1774)
 21 May – Christoph Friedrich von Ammon, German theological writer, preacher (born 1766)
 14 July– August Neander, German theologian, church historian (born 1789)	
 22 September – Johann Heinrich von Thünen, German economist (born 1783)
 4 November – Gustav Schwab, German classical scholar and writer (born 1792)
 28 December - Heinrich Christian Schumacher, German astronomer (born 1780)

 
Years of the 19th century in Germany
Germany
Germany